Nobina AB (former Concordia Bus AB) is the largest bus transport group in the Nordic region, serving markets in Denmark, Finland, Norway and Sweden with a total of 3,347 buses (2014). Since 2005 the group is based in Stockholm.

History 

Concordia Bus BV was founded in 1997 by Schøyen Gruppen (37%) and National Express (63%). The company was registered in Amsterdam, Netherlands, but was managed by Schøyen-subsidiary Concordia Bus Management AS with headquarters in Oslo, Norway.

In 1999, National Express withdrew, while Goldman Sachs' subsidiary Bus Holdings Sàrl (registered in Luxembourg) came in with an owner share of 51.0%. Schøyen owned 47.15% of the shares, while the remaining 1.85% were owned by the management. On 27 October 1999, Concordia Bus and Stagecoach announced that Concordia Bus would buy Swedish bus operator Swebus from Stagecoach Group, which had been acquired in October 1996 as part of the privatisation of the Swedish State Railways' bus operations. The transaction was approved by the European Commission on 10 December 1999 and completed in January 2000. Swebus consisted of holding company Swebus AB, Swedish operating subsidiary Swebus Sverige AB, Finnish operating subsidiary Stagecoach Finland Oy Ab, Swedish tourist coach operator Interbus AB and some other minor subsidiaries. The group structure became, from top to bottom, Concordia Bus BV > Concordia Bus Holding AB > Concordia Bus AB > Concordia Bus Nordic Holding AB > Swebus AB, and then all the subsidiaries. In May 2001, Swebus AB changed name to Concordia Bus Nordic AB, and Swebus Sverige AB subsequently changed to Swebus AB.

1 February 2001, the ownership of Schøyen Gruppen's subsidiary Ingeniør M. O. Schøyens Bilcentraler (SBC) was transferred to Concordia Bus. SBC was one of Norway's oldest and largest bus operators, dating back to 1921.

The acquisition of Swebus was partly financed through bond loans, which led to a financial restructure finalized on 4 October 2005, where the loans were converted to €160 million worth of shares in Concordia Bus AB. The holders of the loans assumed 97.5% of the shares, leaving only 2.5% to Concordia Bus BV and its owners. This meant that Concordia Bus AB became the new head of the group and considered a Swedish group of companies. Concordia Bus BV and its subsidiary Concordia Bus Holding AB have since become defunct. Major new shareholders included Bluebay Asset Management (27%), Bear Stearns (17%), Avenue Capital (11%), Fidelity Funds (9%) and Lone Star (7%).

In March 2006, Concordia Bus Fleet AB was formed to maintain all leased and owned buses, where all leased buses would belong to Concordia Bus Fleet, while all owned buses would belong to Swebus BusCo AB, both companies with the same management. By 1 March 2007 all  buses had been transferred from the operating companies and then leased back to them, with the exception of some special buses in Sweden. By 1 July 2007, SBC changed name to Concordia Bus Norge AS.

19 October 2008, Concordia Bus Danmark A/S commenced their first PSO contract for Movia at North Zealand. Later, operations have been expanded to Jutland.

1 December 2009, the whole group of companies changed name from Concordia Bus to Nobina, with the exception of Swebus Express. The "Nordic" names were also changed to "Europe", apparently showing that Nobina are considering trying their luck outside the Nordic region. As the name Swebus was now available, Swebus Express started trading as just Swebus, while the real name of the company is still Swebus Express AB.

Operations

Structure
Group Structure (at May 2015)

Nobina A/S
Danish operating subsidiary. Operates city buses in Copenhagen, Herlev, Hillerød, Næstved, Roskilde, Frederikssund, Frederiksværk, Holte and Vejle, and regional buses in Hillerød area. Operating since 2008 with headquarters in Glostrup.

Nobina Finland Oy Ab
Former Oy Swebus Finland Ab (with auxiliary business names Espoon Auto and TransBus), Stagecoach Finland Oy Ab and Concordia Bus Finland Oy Ab. Finnish operating subsidiary with history dating back to 1926. Operates in Helsinki area with headquarters in Espoo.

Nobina Norge AS
Former Ingeniør M.O. Schøyens Bilcentraler AS and Concordia Bus Norge AS. Norwegian operating subsidiary, formed in 1921 by Martin Olsen Schøyen. Headquartered in Oslo and operating routes in Oslo, Akershus, Hordaland and the city of Tromsø.

Nobina Sverige AB
Former Swebus AB. Swedish operating subsidiary with history dating back to 1911. Operating in major parts of Sweden.

Swebus Express AB                                                                                                                                                                                                                                                                                                            
Operates intercity coach service in southern parts of Sweden. In 2009 rebranded as just Swebus. On 2 May 2018 Nobina AB sold Swebus to the German long distance coach operator Flixbus.

References

External links

Nobina website

Bus companies of Denmark
Bus companies of Finland
Bus companies of Norway
Bus companies of Sweden
Companies based in Stockholm
National Express companies
Transport companies established in 1997